Chaukhan is a large village located in Jodhpur, Rajasthan, India. It has a population of almost 12,000. Local landmarks include Bhadreshwar Dham Temple and Kadam khandi. Nearby villages include Golasani, Barli, Rajasthan, and Bhadrava Moklavaas. Chokha is situated in the surrounding hills, and Umaid Sagar lake is nearby.
 

Villages in Jodhpur district